Charles Alfred Jeffreys (7 December 1877 – 18 October 1917) was a South African sport shooter who competed in the 1912 Summer Olympics.

In the 1912 Summer Olympics he participated in the following events:

 Team military rifle - fourth place
 300 metre military rifle, three positions - 34th place
 600 metre free rifle - 42nd place
 300 metre free rifle, three positions - 70th place

References

External links
list of South African sport shooters

1877 births
1917 deaths
South African male sport shooters
ISSF rifle shooters
Olympic shooters of South Africa
Shooters at the 1912 Summer Olympics
20th-century South African people